Vali-ye Asr (also Romanized as Valī-ye ‘Aşr; also known as Sūrī, Qātarch, and Qāţerchī) is a village in Suri Rural District, Suri District, Rumeshkhan County, Lorestan Province, Iran. At the 2006 census, its population was 3,717, in 827 families.

References 

Populated places in Rumeshkhan County